The Porsche family (sometimes called Porsche–Piëch family) is a prominent Austrian–German family of industrialists descending from the Austrian–German automotive pioneer Ferdinand Porsche. Its members control Porsche SE and have a majority voting right over Volkswagen AG, the largest automaker in the world. The Porsche family headquarters are in the Austrian town of Zell am See.

Founder

Ferdinand Porsche was born to a German-speaking family of Maffersdorf, Bohemia, son of Anton Porsche (1845–1908) and Anna Ehrlich.

Porsche name

The Sudeten German surname Porsche can be traced to the 18th century in the area of Reichenberg (now Liberec), Bohemia. The surname originates with the German word Bursche ("boy, young man, apprentice, farmhand") and is on record in northern Bohemia in various spellings (Porsch, Borsche, Borsch, Bursche, Bursch, Pursch, Pursche, etc.) from the early 17th century.

Family trees

Ancestry of Ferdinand Porsche

Porsche descendants of Ferdinand

Piëch descendants of Louise Porsche
 Children of Ernst Piëch and his wife Elisabeth Piëch (1936–) daughter of Heinrich Nordhoff (1899-1968)
 Charlotte Wanivenhaus (1960–)
 Florian Piëch (1962–)
 Sebastian Piëch (1967–)
 Children of Louise Daxer-Piëch and her husband Josef Ahorner:
 Louise Dorothea Kiesling (1957–2022)
 Josef Michael Ahorner (1960–)
 Children of Ferdinand Piëch: with wife Corina von Planta (Arianne, Corina, Desiree, Ferdinand "Nando", and Jasmin), with Marlene Maurer (Hans, Anton and Valentin), with Herma Hutter (Ferdinand and Caroline) and with wife Ursula Plasser (Markus, Florina Louise and Gregor Anton)
 Arianne Piëch (1959–)
 Corina Piëch (1960–)  
 Desiree Piëch (1962–)
 Ferdinand "Nando" Piëch (1967–)
 Jasmin Lange-Piëch (1969–)
 Hans Porsche (1973–)
 Valentin Piëch (1975–) 
 Anton "Toni" Piëch (1978–)
 Ferdinand Piëch Junior (1979–)
 Caroline Piëch (1982–)
 Markus Piëch (1985–)
 Florina Louise Pantic (1987–)
 Gregor Anton Piëch (1994–)
 Children of Hans Michel Piëch and his wife Veronika Piëch (Helene and Sophie): 
 Claudia Fox Linton (1964–)
 Melanie Wenckheim (1967–) 
 Stefan Piëch (1970–)
 Julia Kuhn-Piëch (1981–)
 Helene Piëch (1993–)
 Sophie Piëch (1995–)

Porsche descendants of Ferry Porsche
 Children of Ferdinand Alexander Porsche and his wife Brigitte Bube (1937-):
 Ferdinand Oliver Porsche (1961-)
 Kai Alexander Porsche (1964-)
 Mark Philipp Porsche (1977-)
 Children of Gerhard Porsche and his wife Iris Porsche (Diana):
Geraldine Porsche (1980-)
Diana Porsche (1996-)
 Child of Hans-Peter Porsche and his wife Kuni Porsche:
Peter Daniell Porsche (1973-)
 Children of Wolfgang Porsche: with wife Karin Handler (Christian and Stephanie), with wife Susanne Porsche (Ferdinand and Felix)
Christian Porsche (1974-)
Stephanie Porsche-Schroder (1978-)
Ferdinand Rudolf Porsche (1993-)
Felix Alexander Porsche (1996-)

Shareholdings
 Porsche SE (subscribed capital: 50%/voting power: 100%)
 Volkswagen Group (subscribed capital: 31.9%/voting power: 53.4%)
 Porsche (subscribed capital: 75%/voting power: 75% - 1)
 Porsche Holding
 Porsche (subscribed capital: 12.5%/voting power: 25% + 1)
 Porsche Design Group 
 Piëch Automotive (co-owned by Toni Piëch)

Gallery

References

External links

 "The Porsche Story: A Fierce Family Feud", Der Spiegel
 Die Porsches: Ein Clan, ein Imperium 
 Family tree: Ahnenforschung PORSCHE / PIËCH

 
German people of German Bohemian descent
People of Sudeten German descent